is a Japanese potter.
Ito Sekisui V is the 14th generation of his  family to follow a long tradition of ceramic work. He was given the birth name Yoichi Ito, the first character of his name ("yo" ) being the Japanese word for "kiln". After his father Ito Sekisui IV's death (when Yoichi was 19), he studied ceramics at Kyoto University. After graduating in 1966, he returned to his home town of Sado to continue the family business.

His work was displayed at the Traditional Arts and Crafts Exhibition in 1972. In 1973, he won first prize at the second Japan Ceramic Art Exhibition.

In the 1980s, Sekisui V started to create neriage works as well as his family's traditional mumyoi-yaki pieces and, in 2003, he was appointed a Living National Treasure of Japan for his work in these fields.

References

Living people
Japanese ceramists
Living National Treasures of Japan
1941 births
20th-century Japanese people
21st-century Japanese people